Linuxconf is a system configuration tool for the Linux operating system. It features different user interfaces: a text interface or a graphical user interface in the form of a Web page or native application. Most Linux distributions consider it deprecated compared to other tools such as Webmin, the system-config-* tools on Red Hat Enterprise Linux/Fedora, drakconf on Mandriva, YaST on openSUSE and so on. Linuxconf was deprecated from Red Hat Linux in version 7.1 in April 2001.

It was created by Jacques Gélinas of Solucorp, a company based in Québec. It is licensed under the terms of the GNU General Public License.

References

External links

 Linuxconf home page

Free system software
Linux configuration utilities
Unix configuration utilities
Software that uses GTK